A trierarchy was a type of obligation called a liturgy, a debt similar to a tax on the very wealthy in Ancient Athens.  The person (or persons) up on whom the duty fell is called a trierarch.  The trierarch was responsible for the outfitting, maintenance, operation and leadership of a warship known as a trireme, the hull and mast of the ship being provided by the State.  The responsibility might fall on one person or be shared, in which case it was known as a syntrierarchy.  The cost of a whole trierarchy was not less than forty minas nor more than a talent with the average being 50 minas.  The burden of the trierarchy was so great that during some years no other liturgy could be assessed in the same or the following year.

Four eras of trierarchy
The trierarchy's can be divided into four distinct eras, each having a distinct time period and   obligation and implementation.

First trierarchy
The beginning of the trierarchy dates from before the time of Hippias (460 BCE).  Starting with the 48 naucrarias of Solon (638–558 BCE) and the 50 naucrarias of Cleisthenes each naucraria was obliged to equip a ship.  When the naval force was gradually increased to 200 vessels, the number at sea at the time of the Battle of Salamis, the trierarchs also became more numerous.

Second trierarchy
The second form began in 409 BCE. It was during this time the trierarchy began being shared by more than one trierarch, this arrangement known as a syntrierarchy may have been because there were not enough citizens of sufficient wealth to support the 400 triremes in use every year.  The command of the ship would be as worked out between the two, amongst themselves.  The ships improvements that had been funded by a previous trierarch were often left with the ship with the new trierarch(s) being responsible to reimburse the previous trierarch for the improvements.

Third trierarchy
The third form was established by Periander and lasted from 357 to 341 BCE.  During this period up to 16 individuals might form a trierarchy known as a symmoria.  They would share the burden in equal shares regardless of their actual wealth. The supervision of the whole business would be left to the wealthiest individual, who would often contract a commander for the whole sum from their colleagues so that many in reality paid nothing and yet were exempted by the trierarchy from all other liturgies.

Fourth trierarchy
Demosthenes, well aware of the defects of the third form or symmoria, brought forward a new law in 340 BCE that improved the funding and operation of the trierarchy.  The trierarchy were rated for a trireme according to their property as stated in the register in such a manner that one trireme was required from 10 talents. If their wealth was valued at a higher than 10 talents  they would be assigned up to three triremes and one auxiliary vessel.  Those who had less than 10 talents were to unite in syntelia until they made up that sum.

References

External links
 "T" Classic Technology Center (includes a Hear it wav of "trierarchy")

Navy of ancient Athens
Taxation in ancient Athens